"An Old Pair of Shoes" is a song recorded by American country music artist Randy Travis.  It was released in April 1993 as the second single from his Greatest Hits, Volume One compilation album.  The song reached #21 on the Billboard Hot Country Singles & Tracks chart.  The song was written by Jerry Foster, Art Masters and Johnny Morris.

Chart performance

References

1993 singles
1993 songs
Randy Travis songs
Songs written by Jerry Foster
Song recordings produced by Kyle Lehning
Warner Records singles